The Duke is an American comedy series that aired on NBC from July 2 to September 3, 1954. The series was broadcast live.

Synopsis
Duke London a/k/a Duke Zenlee was a professional boxer who was also an accomplished painter. Through his artwork he met Rudy Cromwell, who offered to teach him to live a more cultured life. Duke left the boxing ring and opened a nightclub called The Duke's, but both his former promoter and trainer kept trying to persuade him to make a prize-fighting comeback.

Cast
 Paul Gilbert as Duke London
 Allen Jenkins as Johnny, Duke's former trainer
 Phyllis Coates as Gloria, his girlfriend
 Rudy Cromwell as Claude Stroud, taught Duke to appreciate intellectual pursuits
 Sheldon Leonard as Sam Marco, Duke's former fight promoter

References

External links 
 

NBC original programming
1954 American television series debuts
1954 American television series endings
1950s American sitcoms
Black-and-white American television shows
English-language television shows